The Czech Indoor Open was played on the indoor hard courts of Sport Center Hala Club Hotel (known as Sportovní Hala Club Hotel Průhonice in original language). It was part of ATP Challenger Series. It was held in Průhonice, Czech Republic since 2003.

Record holder is Igor Zelenay who won two consecutive doubles editions with different partners.

History
The Czech Indoor Open was played since its inception on the courts of the Sport Center Club Hotel in Průhonice, in front of the hotel which served as accommodation for participants. Its three editions were named Czech Indoor Open by Třinecké železárny in 2003, as Czech Indoor Open by ČEZ in 2004, and as Zentiva Czech Indoor Open in 2005, every time for sponsorship reasons.

Past finals

Men's singles

Women's singles

Men's doubles

Women's doubles

See also
Neridé Prague Indoor

References

External links
Official Website
ITF Women's Draws

Indoor hard court tennis tournaments
Hard court tennis tournaments
Czech Indoor Open
ATP Challenger Tour
Defunct tennis tournaments in the Czech Republic